Electric Transit may refer to:

 Electric Transit, Inc. (ETI), a former manufacturer of trolley buses, from 1994 to 2004
 Electric Transit (software company), a short-lived software publishing company in the mid-1980s
 Electric transit, public transit that employs electricity for propulsion, such as trams, trolleybuses and other kinds of electric buses

See also
 Servicio de Transportes Eléctricos (Electric Transit Service – public agency in Mexico City)